Hristo Prodanov (24 February 1943 – 21 April 1984) was a Bulgarian mountaineer. Prodanov was the first Bulgarian to climb Mount Everest, doing it via the most difficult way—the West Ridge—as well as alone and without oxygen. Prodanov was the first person to climb Everest in April, when the weather conditions are generally too bad for an expedition, and also the thirteenth person (the first person from the West Ridge) to climb Everest without the use of bottled oxygen. Climbing the summit at 18:15 local time, he had to descend overnight and got lost shortly after that. On the next afternoon, he reported he had lost his gloves and soon would be unable to hold the radio button long enough to talk. His body was never found.

Prodanov was still a student when he became involved in mountaineering. He began work as a metallurgical engineer in Kremikovtzi AD in 1976. He had his first 7000 m ascent on 6 August 1967 when he climbed Lenin Peak. He had previously climbed several peaks in the Alps.

His major successes were related to Hindu Kush (1976) and Lhotse. In 1981, he was the first Bulgarian to climb Lhotse without the use of supplementary oxygen.

His niece, Mariana Prodanova Maslarova, attempted to climb Mt. Everest (without the use of supplemental oxygen) on the 20th anniversary of her uncle's death. Maslarova died of exposure at 8,700 meters, exactly 20 years and 30 days after her uncle.

Climbs

8000m ascents
 Lhotse (8516m) - 30 April 1981, solo, without oxygen
 Everest (8848m) - 20 April 1984, solo, without oxygen

7000m ascents
 Lenin Peak (7134m) - 2 August 1975, 28 July 1982, 6 August 1982, 13 July 1983, 2 August 1983
 Communism Peak, today known as Ismail Samani Peak (7495m) - 29 July 1980, 24 July 1983
 Peak Korzhenevskaya (7105m) - 28 July 1979, 31 July 1979, 8 August 1982, 29 July 1983
 Noshaq (7492m) - 30 July 1976

Alps
 North face of Matterhorn (4471m) - 21–26 September 1974, together with Trifon Djambazov
 North face of Grand Jorasses on the Walker Spur (4208m) - 30 July - 1 August 1967, together with Atanas Kovandzhiev
 Petit Dru (3733m), Bonatti route - 16–18 July 1967; "Route of Guides" - 3–8 September 1977
 Mont Blanc (4807m), Freney Pillar - 15–16 July 1969

Caucasus
 Pillar of Ushba - 25–28 July 1970
 Traverse in Shkhelda (4320m) – 24 July – 1 August 1973

Awards
Prodanov received several awards, including:

 No. 1 Bulgarian Mountaineer for the 20th century.
 "Hero of People's Republic of Bulgaria" (1984 – posthumously)
 "Georgi Dimitrov" order (1981; 1984 – posthumously)
 "People's Republic of Bulgaria", second class (1977)

See also
List of 20th-century summiters of Mount Everest
List of people who disappeared

References

External links 
 Climbing Everest Voted Bulgaria's Sports Event of 20th Century
 Everest History: Hristo Prodanov

1943 births
1980s missing person cases
1984 deaths
20th-century Bulgarian people
Bulgarian mountain climbers
Heroes of the People's Republic of Bulgaria
Missing person cases in Asia
Mountaineering deaths on Mount Everest
People from Karlovo
Summiters of Mount Everest